The 1945 season was the thirty-fourth season for Santos FC.

References

External links
Official Site 

Santos
1945
1945 in Brazilian football